Said El Mahalla Shooting Club, is an Egyptian football club based in El Mahalla, Egypt. The club currently plays in the Egyptian Second Division, the second-highest league in the Egyptian football league system.

Egyptian Second Division
Football clubs in Egypt